John Henry Waddell (February 14, 1921 – November 27, 2019) was an American sculptor, painter and educator. He had a long career in art education and has many sculptures on public display, but he may be best known for That Which Might Have Been—his memorial to the four girls killed in the 1963 bombing of the 16th Street Baptist Church in Birmingham, Alabama.

Early life
Waddell was born in Des Moines, Iowa in 1921 and moved to Evanston, Illinois, at the age of ten. There he began to study art at the Katherine Lord Studio, and by the age of 16 was teaching classes there. In 1939, he graduated from Evanston Township High School and moved to Chicago where he attended the School of the Art Institute.

In 1942, Waddell married his first wife, Elizabeth Owen, and they had three children: Sean Owen, Seamus, and Seanchan Waddell. Elizabeth and John divorced in 1948. At the time, he was working at Buick Aviation Plant, Melrose Park, Illinois—as America had entered World War II.

Waddell's education was interrupted by a stint in the US Army 1943-1945. Serving as Private First Class during the War, one of his contributions was as a muralist of hope. On the GI Bill, Waddell returned to the School of the Art Institute. He earned two Master's Degrees there and later an Honorary Doctorate from the National College of Education, Chicago (now known as National Louis University).

It was at the Art Institute that Waddell met artist Ruth Holland. In 1949, they were married in a small ceremony with friends and fellow students, Leon Golub and Nancy Spero, as witnesses. Through the decades Ruth appeared in many of his paintings and sculptures. Waddell also became a primary muse in Ruth’s work. They remained married until Waddell's death in 2019 and had two additional sons and a daughter: Lindsey and William Waddell and filmmaker Amy Waddell, respectively.

Career
Waddell began having one-man shows of his artwork as early as 1942. He had dozens of such shows over the course of six decades as a professional artist.

His career as an art educator began in earnest in 1947 when he started teaching evening adult classes in the Central YMCA Adult Education Program in Chicago, which he did until 1955. Overlapping with this position was the teaching of art and art education at the National College of Education—from 1949 to 1955. He assumed the position of head of art education at the IIT Institute of Design in 1955. While in Chicago, Waddell designed a program for students with Down's Syndrome and varied mental and physical challenges at Bruno Bettelheim’s Orthogenic School.

In 1957, Waddell moved his family to Arizona and became head of Art Education at Arizona State College (later known as Arizona State University). He retired from ASU in 1964 to devote all of his energies to his artwork.

In 2007, several life-sized bronze sculptures by Waddell were stolen, probably due to the value of the metal after the work has been melted.

Death
Waddell died November 27, 2019, at the age of 98.

Selected public works

Dance Mother (Ruth), - Phoenix Art Museum, Phoenix Arizona  1962
Dance Daughters, - Yuma Art Center, Yuma, Arizona, 1963
That Which Might Have Been: Birmingham 1963, - Unitarian Universalist Congregation of Phoenix 1964; George Washington Carver Museum and Cultural Center, Phoenix
Family, - Maricopa County Building, Phoenix, AZ 1967
Past and Present. – Glendale Community College, Glendale, Arizona  1968
Dance, Downtown Phoenix, AZ, 1968 to 1974
Marlo Seated, Phoenix Public Library, Phoenix AZ, 1977
Seated Flute Player, Weinstein Center for the Performing Arts, Evanston, Illinois, and University of Arizona, Tucson, Arizona, 1979
Apogee & Momentum, U.S. Tennis Association, Flushing Meadows, New York 1980 - 1988
Welcoming Muse, Robert Mondavi Winery, Oakville, California
I Am That I Am, Congregation Beth Israel (Scottsdale, Arizona), 1982
Seated Flute Player & Harpist, Ravinia Park, Chicago

Awards
Performing and Broadcast Arts Hall of Fame, The Herberger Theater (Phoenix), inducted in 2001.

References

Further reading
Kvaran, Einar Einarsson, Tracking the Nudes of Phoenix, unpublished manuscript
Sarda, Michel F., John Henry Waddell: the Art and the Artist, Bridgewood Press, Phoenix, Arizona 1996 
Waddell, John Henry and Ann R. Mealy, The Beauty of Individual Differences: A Study of the Waddell Sculpture Fellowship and the Master-Apprentice Relationship'', John Henry Waddell and Ann R Mealy, Flagstaff, Arizona 1985

External links
Official Website
Rising by Waddell - Relief

1921 births
2019 deaths
20th-century American painters
American male painters
Arizona State University faculty
American art educators
Illinois Institute of Technology faculty
Modern painters
Modern sculptors
Artists from Des Moines, Iowa
People from Evanston, Illinois
Artists from Phoenix, Arizona
School of the Art Institute of Chicago alumni
University of Chicago alumni
National Louis University faculty
20th-century American sculptors
20th-century American male artists
American male sculptors
Sculptors from Iowa
Military personnel from Iowa
Sculptors from Arizona